Prionosuchus is an extinct genus of large temnospondyl. A single species P. plummeri, is recognized from the Early Permian (some time between 299 and 272 million years ago). Its fossils have been found in what is now northeastern Brazil.

Description 

The fragmentary remains of this animal have been found in the Pedra do Fogo Formation in the Parnaíba Basin of Northeastern Brazil, in the states of Piauí and Maranhão, and it was described by L.I. Price in 1948. Several more fragmentary specimens have been found. Based on related species and comparisons with living gharials, the total body length of this specimen has been estimated at more than 5.6 meters (18⅓ ft).

With an elongated and tapered snout, numerous sharp teeth, long body, short legs, and a tail adapted for swimming, its general appearance was very similar to a modern gharial or gar, and it probably had a similar lifestyle as an ambush aquatic predator feeding on fish and other aquatic animals. A study on the closely related Archegosaurus shows that it had a heat balance, gas exchange, osmoregulation, and digestion more similar to that of fish than modern aquatic amphibians; the same probably applied to Prionosuchus as well.

Classification
Prionosuchus has been classified as an archegosaurian by Carroll. The genus is monotypic with P. plummeri being the only species described. The archegosaurs were a group of temnospondyli that occupied the ecological niche of crocodiles and alligators during the Permian, and of which the European genus Archegosaurus is typical. The group became extinct at the end of the Permian and the niche was subsequently filled by other, new temnospondyls, later joined by reptiles such as the phytosaurs in the Triassic period.

Cox and Hutchinson re-evaluated Prionosuchus in 1991 and synonymized it with the genus Platyoposaurus from Russia. On the basis of this study, the Pedra do Fogo Formation was reevaluated to be of Middle to Late Permian age. However, studies based on plants and pollens indicate that this formation is actually early Permian in age, making Prionosuchus not contemporary with Platyoposaurus. More recent research rejects the later Permian date.

Paleoecology
Prionosuchus lived in a humid and tropical environment as indicated by the petrified forest of the Pedra do Fogo formation in which  fossils of this animal have been found. The strata composed of siltstones, shales and limestones were deposited in lagoonal and fluvial environments. Other animals discovered in the same rocks include fish (primitive sharks, palaeoniscids, and lungfish) and amphibians.

References 

Prehistoric amphibian genera
Cisuralian temnospondyls
Permian temnospondyls of South America
Permian Brazil
Fossils of Brazil
Fossil taxa described in 1948